Ian Gordon is the name of:

Ian Gordon (athlete) (born 1950), Canadian Olympic sprinter
Ian Gordon (footballer) (born 1933), former Australian rules footballer
Ian Gordon (general) (born 1952), Deputy Chief of Army and Commander of UNTSO
Ian Gordon (historian) (born 1964), professor of US history at the National University of Singapore
Ian Gordon (ice hockey) (born 1975), German hockey player
Ian Gordon (rower) (born 1948), Canadian Olympic rower